The following lists events that happened during 2015 in Argentina.

Incumbents
 President: Cristina Fernández de Kirchner (until December 10) – Mauricio Macri
 Vice president: Amado Boudou (until December 10) – Gabriela Michetti

Governors
Governor of Buenos Aires Province: Daniel Scioli (until 10 December); María Eugenia Vidal (starting 10 December)
Governor of Catamarca Province: Lucía Corpacci 
Governor of Chaco Province: 
 until 27 February: Juan Carlos Bacileff Ivanoff 
 27 February-10 December: Jorge Capitanich
 starting 10 December: Domingo Peppo
Governor of Chubut Province: Martín Buzzi (until 10 December); Mario Das Neves (starting 10 December)
Governor of Córdoba: José Manuel De la Sota (until 10 December); Juan Schiaretti (starting 10 December)
Governor of Corrientes Province: Ricardo Colombi 
Governor of Entre Ríos Province: Sergio Urribarri (until 10 December); Gustavo Bordet (starting 10 December)
Governor of Formosa Province: Gildo Insfrán
Governor of Jujuy Province: Eduardo Fellner (until 10 December); Gerardo Morales (starting 10 December)
Governor of La Pampa Province: Óscar Jorge (until 10 December); Carlos Verna (starting 10 December)
Governor of La Rioja Province: Luis Beder Herrera (until 10 December); Sergio Casas (starting 10 December)
Governor of Mendoza Province: Francisco Pérez (until 10 December); Alfredo Cornejo (starting 10 December)
Governor of Misiones Province: Maurice Closs (until 10 December); Hugo Passalacqua (starting 10 December)
Governor of Neuquén Province: Jorge Sapag (until 10 December); Omar Gutiérrez (starting 10 December)
Governor of Río Negro Province: Alberto Weretilneck 
Governor of Salta Province: Juan Manuel Urtubey 
Governor of San Juan Province: José Luis Gioja (until 10 December); Sergio Uñac (starting 10 December)
Governor of San Luis Province: Claudio Poggi (until 10 December); Alberto Rodríguez Saá (starting 10 December)
Governor of Santa Cruz Province: Daniel Peralta (until 10 December); Alicia Kirchner (starting 10 December)
Governor of Santa Fe Province: Antonio Bonfatti (until 10 December); Miguel Lifschitz (starting 10 December)
Governor of Santiago del Estero: Claudia Ledesma Abdala
Governor of Tierra del Fuego: Fabiana Ríos (until 10 December); Rosana Bertone (starting 10 December)
Governor of Tucumán: José Alperovich (until 29 October); Juan Luis Manzur (starting 29 October)

Vice Governors
Vice Governor of Buenos Aires Province: Gabriel Mariotto (until 29 October); Daniel Salvador (starting 29 October)
Vice Governor of Catamarca Province: Dalmacio Mera (until 10 December); Octavio Gutiérrez (starting 10 December)
Vice Governor of Chaco Province: 
 until 27 February: Vacant
 27 February-10 December: Juan Carlos Bacileff Ivanoff
 starting 10 December: Daniel Capitanich 
Vice Governor of Corrientes Province: Gustavo Canteros 
Vice Governor of Entre Rios Province: José Orlando Cáceres (until 10 December); Adán Bahl (starting 10 December)
Vice Governor of Formosa Province: Floro Bogado 
Vice Governor of Jujuy Province: Guillermo Jenefes (until 10 December); Carlos Haquim (starting 10 December)
Vice Governor of La Pampa Province: Norma Durango (until 10 December); Mariano Fernández (starting 10 December)
Vice Governor of La Rioja Province: Sergio Casas (until 10 December); Néstor Bosetti (starting 10 December)
Vice Governor of Misiones Province: Hugo Passalacqua (until 10 December); Oscar Herrera Ahuad (starting 10 December)
Vice Governor of Neuquén Province: Ana Pechen (until 10 December); Rolando Figueroa (starting 10 December)
Vice Governor of Rio Negro Province: Carlos Peralta (until 10 December); Pedro Pesatti (starting 10 December)
Vice Governor of Salta Province: Andrés Zottos (until 10 December); Miguel Isa (starting 10 December)
Vice Governor of San Juan Province: Sergio Uñac (until 10 December); Marcelo Lima (starting 10 December)
Vice Governor of San Luis Province: Jorge Raúl Díaz (until 10 December); Carlos Ponce (starting 10 December)
Vice Governor of Santa Cruz: Fernando Cotillo (until 10 December); Pablo González (starting 10 December)
Vice Governor of Santa Fe Province: Jorge Henn (until 10 December); Carlos Fascendini (starting 10 December)
Vice Governor of Santiago del Estero: José Emilio Neder
Vice Governor of Tierra del Fuego: Roberto Crocianelli (until 10 December); Juan Carlos Arcando (starting 10 December)

Events

January
 January 2: Alberto Kryvszuk, former mayor of El Soberbio and fugitive, gives himself up to the police.
 January 5: Héctor Eduardo Ruiz, former mayor of La Banda and fugitive, is captured by the police.
 January 8: A new law adds the election of the members to the Mercosur Parliament in the upcoming general elections.
 January 9: Judge Enrique Lavié Pico prevents the appointment of 16 kirchnerite prosecutors.
 January 11
 Minister Héctor Timerman takes part in the Republican marches against the Charlie Hebdo shooting in France, despite the lack of presidential authorization.
 Sergio Massa and Francisco de Narváez make an alliance for the general elections. 
 January 14: Prosecutor Alberto Nisman denounces president Cristina Fernández de Kirchner and foreign minister Héctor Timerman of a plan to conceal the Iranian involvement in the 1994 AMIA Bombing. The Republican Proposal party summons him to Congress, to explain the denounce in full detail. 
 January 18: Death of Alberto Nisman, prosecutor that investigated the AMIA Bombing.

February
 February 18 – The 18F demonstration takes place, a month after Nisman's death, still unresolved by then.

March
 March 1 –  Cristina Kirchner opens the 2015 sessions of the Argentine Congress.
 March 9 –  Two helicopters collide in mid-air in a remote area of northwestern Argentina leaving at least ten dead. Among the dead are a group of French sports stars participating in a reality-television show called Dropped.

April

May

June
 #NiUnaMenos massive demonstration against femicides.

July

August

September

October
 October 25 – The general elections are held.

November

December
 10: Mauricio Macri takes office as the president of Argentina.

Deaths
 January 18: Alberto Nisman
 February 27: Julio César Strassera
 March 8: Gerardo Sofovich
 June 13: Sergio Renán
 June 18: Roberto M. Levingston
 June 25: Alejandro Romay
 June 29: Mario Losada
 August 21: Ana Baron, journalist (b. 1950)

See also 
 List of Argentine films of 2015

References

External links
 

 
2010s in Argentina
Argentina
Argentina
Years of the 21st century in Argentina